Lido Pimienta (born 1986) is a Colombian Canadian musician, singer, and songwriter. She rose to prominence after her 2016 album, La Papessa, won the 2017 Polaris Music Prize. Her music incorporates a variety of styles and influences, including traditional indigenous and Afro-Colombian musical styles such as Cumbia and Bullerengue, as well as contemporary synthpop and electronic music.

Early life 
Originally from Barranquilla, Colombia, she later immigrated to Canada, settling in London, Ontario, before moving to Toronto, where she is currently based. Her father died when she was six years old.

Career 
Pimienta released her debut album, Color, in 2010. The album was produced by Michael Ramey, Pimienta's husband at the time, and was released by Los Angeles based music label KUDETA. After Pimienta and Ramey separated, Pimienta took time to pursue a degree in art criticism, in addition to learning more about music production, before releasing her second album, La Papessa, in 2016. That year, she also collaborated with A Tribe Called Red on several tracks for their 2016 album We Are the Halluci Nation.

Following the release of her experimental album La Papessa, which was self-produced by Pimienta, she was awarded the 2017 Polaris Music Prize, which is considered Canada's top juried music award. The Globe and Mail called her "the future of Canadian rock and roll", and dubbed her the "artist of the year".

There was controversy surrounding her performance at the Halifax Pop Explosion music festival on October 19, 2017. Pimienta, as she often does during her concerts, invited the "brown girls to the front" and asked that white people move back. Some white audience members saw the request as racist, and a white volunteer photographer refused to move from her spot near the stage. When the photographer refused to move after repeated requests, Pimienta said, "you're cutting into my set time and you're disrespecting these women, and I don't have time for this". The photographer was removed from the show and the festival organizers later apologized to Pimienta, saying they would increase "anti-oppression and anti-racism training".

In addition to working as a musician, Pimienta is also a visual artist and curator, and her work has been described as exploring "the politics of gender, race, motherhood, identity and the construct of the Canadian landscape in the Latin American"; her work was exhibited in the group exhibition FEMINISTRY IS HERE at Mercer Union gallery in Toronto.

She later in 2020 released Miss Colombia, her follow up studio album to her award winning album La Papessa. The title was derived from the 2015 Miss Universe beauty pageant incident, which sparked an outrage from the Colombian people. This prompted her to reflect on many things like her Colombian heritage and pride, and caused her to fall into a depression. Many themes and ideas surrounding the album, Miss Colombia, are a reflection on this outrage and depression, as GET IN HER EARS states a "vivid celebration (and criticism) of her Colombian heritage".

Pimienta has announced the launch of a television program titled Lido TV. The show is set to premiere at the Toronto International Film Festival on September 11, 2022. Following its premiere, the show will be available to stream on CBC Gem beginning September 23, 2022. Press coverage describes LIDO TV as a variety show that will explore themes that include feminism, colonialism, privilege, beauty, success, and hate. The show's format will include documentary footage, interviews, sketch comedy, and puppetry performances that are hosted, written, and produced by Pimienta.

Personal life 
Pimienta identifies as queer. She is of mixed Afro-Colombian and Wayuu descent. She is a single parent.

Discography
 Color (2010)
 La Papessa (2016)
 Miss Colombia (2020)

Awards and nominations

References

21st-century Black Canadian women singers
Canadian pop singers
Colombian emigrants to Canada
Colombian LGBT singers
Canadian LGBT singers
People from Barranquilla
Musicians from Toronto
Wayuu people
Afro-Colombian women
Living people
Canadian record producers
Canadian electronic musicians
Polaris Music Prize winners
1986 births
Canadian women record producers
Canadian women in electronic music
Women in Latin music
LGBT people in Latin music
Anti- (record label) artists
Queer women
21st-century Canadian LGBT people